Etheridgeum is a genus of snake in the family Colubridae. The genus is monotypic, containing the sole species Etheridgeum pulchrum, which is commonly known as the Sumatra Etheridge snake, and is native to Indonesia.

Etymology
The generic name, Etheridgeum, is in honor of American herpetologist Richard Emmett Etheridge (1929–2019). The specific name, pulchrum, is Latin for "beautiful".

Geographic range
E. pulchrum is endemic to Sumatra, Indonesia.

Habitat
The preferred natural habitat of E. pulchrum is forest.

Description
The dorsal scales are smooth, and they are arranged in 15 rows throughout the length of the body.

Behavior
E. pulchrum is terrestrial and semifossorial.

References

Further reading
Teynié A, David P, Ohler A (2010). "Note on a collection of Amphibians and Reptiles from Western Sumatra (Indonesia), with the description of a new species of the genus Bufo". Zootaxa 2416: 1–43.
Wallach V (1988). "Status and redescription of the genus Padangia Werner, with comparative visceral data on Collorhabdium Smedley and other genera (Serpentes: Colubridae)". Amphibia-Reptilia 9 (1): 61–76. (Etheridgeum pulchrum, replacement name).
Werner F (1924). "Neue oder wenig bekannte Schlangen aus dem Naturhistorischen Staatsmuseum in Wien ". Sitzungberichte der Kaiserliche Akademie der Wissenschaften in Wien 133: 29–56. (Padangia, new genus, p. 54; P. pulchra, new species, pp. 54–55, Figure 8). (in German).

Colubrids
Monotypic snake genera
Reptiles of Indonesia